Elk is an unincorporated community in Noble County, in the U.S. state of Ohio.

History
Elk was originally called Fredericktown, and under the latter name was laid out in 1854. A post office later was established at Fredericktown under the name Elk. The Elk post office opened in 1873, and remained in operation until 1910.

References

Unincorporated communities in Noble County, Ohio
Unincorporated communities in Ohio